George Gary Noonan ( – April 5, 1962) was a state legislator in Illinois. He represented Cook County District 3 in the Illinois House of Representatives. He was a Democrat. His wife predeceased him. He had a brother and a sister, and for a period, he produced cigars.

See also
 List of African-American officeholders (1900–1959)

References

1962 deaths
Democratic Party members of the Illinois House of Representatives
Illinois politicians